Molla Dadi (also Romanized as Mollā Dādī; also known as Mollā ‘Alī, Mollādārī, and Mollā Darvī) is a village in Qorqori Rural District, Qorqori District, Hirmand County, Sistan and Baluchestan Province, Iran. At the 2006 census, its population was 1,075, in 225 families.

References 

Populated places in Hirmand County